East Teke is a member of the Teke dialect continuum of the Congolese plateau. The dialects Mosieno and Ŋee (Esingee) may constitute a separate language from Tio (Teo, Tyo) also known as Bali (Ibali) (Teke proper).

References

Teke languages